Norbury is a hamlet and civil parish in Cheshire, England, which includes the small settlements of Gauntons Bank, Hurst Green, Swanwick Green, Norbury Common and Holtridge, with a total population of nearly 200 people in 2011. Nearby villages include No Man's Heath, Marbury and Wrenbury.

History

Norberie was a small manor at the time of the Domesday survey in 1086. It was then held by William Malbank, Baron of Wich Malbank (Nantwich), and had been held by Earl Harold before the Norman Conquest. The record is combined with the nearby manors of Wirswall and Marbury. The Anglo-Saxon manor is believed to have been a fortified farmstead.

There were three Nonconformist chapels in the 19th century, all now defunct. A Wesleyan Methodist chapel was constructed in 1834 on Norbury Town Lane in Norbury hamlet, and appears in John Marius Wilson's gazetteer entry of 1870–72. Another Wesleyan Methodist chapel, also on Norbury Town Lane, dates from 1899 and closed in 1975. A Congregationalist chapel was built in 1868 on Common Lane in Norbury Common.

Governance
Norbury is administered by the Marbury & District Parish Council, jointly with the adjacent civil parishes of Marbury cum Quoisley and Wirswall. From 1974 the civil parish was served by Crewe and Nantwich Borough Council, which was succeeded on 1 April 2009 by the new unitary authority of Cheshire East. Norbury falls in the parliamentary constituency of Eddisbury, which has been represented by Edward Timpson since 2019, after being represented by Antoinette Sandbach (2015–19).

Geography and transport

The terrain is undulating with low hills. The hamlet of Norbury stands on a low hill, and the high point of the parish is at an elevation of  immediately to its west, with a trig point and a covered reservoir. The Llangollen Canal runs along or just inside the southern boundary, before cutting into the south-east corner of the parish. Steer Brook flows out of Bar Mere in Bickley to run along part of Norbury's western boundary; it then runs immediately south of the canal, turning southwards near the eastern boundary to join Marbury Brook. There are also numerous unnamed drains as well as occasional small ponds and meres within the area (although Norbury Meres lie in the adjacent parish of Cholmondeley). There are several small areas of woodland, including Canal Covert around the canal and Steer Brook, Handley Park Covert, and Norbury Common in the north-west corner of the parish, near Common Farm.

The A49 runs north–south just to the west of the parish, connecting via Marbury Road and Snab Lane with a network of lanes within Norbury parish. Two lanes lead towards Wrenbury: Frith Lane runs east to Cholmondeley Lane just outside Wrenbury village, and Holtridge Lane runs north to connect with the same lane further west. Another two lanes go south to Marbury: Marbury Road and School Lane, via two road bridges over the canal: Steer Bridge (carrying Marbury Road) and Church Bridge (School Lane). A lock, Marbury Lock, is located at Church Bridge.

Demography
The population has declined since the 19th century; historical population figures are 330 (1801), 403 (1851), 330 (1881), 289 (1901) and 241 (1951). According to the 2001 census, the civil parish had a population of 190, remaining steady at 194 in 87 households at the 2011 census.

Landmarks

Several buildings in the civil parish are listed at grade II, the lowest of the three grades. The oldest listed building may be Stokes Cottage in Swanwick Green, a timber-framed longhouse with brick infill and a thatched roof; it dates from the 16th or early 17th century. Another candidate is Brook Farmhouse in Gauntons Bank, part of which originally dates from the late 16th century, and was subsequently extended several times. The original building is timber framed with brick infill and a tiled roof. 

The Holtridge in Holtridge is a T-shaped, red-brick farmhouse dating originally from the early 17th century; it has a 20th-century oriel window. Olive Cottage in Norbury Common is a timber-framed building with brick infill and a thatched roof; it dates originally from the mid-17th century. Church Bridge on the Llangollen Canal dates from the late 18th or early 19th century; its single span is constructed of red sandstone.

Education

There are no educational facilities in Norbury. The civil parish falls within the catchment areas of Brine Leas School in Nantwich, and Wrenbury Primary School.

See also

Listed buildings in Norbury, Cheshire

References

Sources
J. D. Bu'Lock (1972), Pre-Conquest Cheshire: 383–1066. A History of Cheshire Vol. 3 (J. J. Bagley, ed.), Cheshire Community Council
B. M. C. Husain (1973), Cheshire under the Norman Earls: 1066–1237. A History of Cheshire Vol. 4 (J. J. Bagley, ed.), Cheshire Community Council
Local History Group, F. A. Latham (ed.) (1999), Wrenbury and Marbury, The Local History Group 

External links

Villages in Cheshire
Civil parishes in Cheshire